The Grand Army of the Republic Hall, also known as the General Frederick W. Lander Post No. 5, Grand Army of the Republic, is an historic building located at 58 Andrew Street in Lynn, Massachusetts, in the United States. 

The hall was built in 1885 by members of the Grand Army of the Republic as a meeting hall and memorial to the Union Army veterans of the Civil War. Of many such halls built in the country, the Lynn GAR Hall is the largest. Only 13 remain nationwide, and only this one in Massachusetts.

On May 7, 1979, it was added to the National Register of Historic Places. 

The hall is now the Grand Army of the Republic Museum.

History
The hall was the meeting place of the General Frederick W. Lander Post No. 5, which was one of 210 GAR posts in Massachusetts. It was designed by Wheeler & Northend, Lynn architects.

It is now the Grand Army of the Republic Museum.

See also
 List of Registered Historic Places in Essex County, Massachusetts
 Sons of Union Veterans of the Civil War

References

External links
 Grand Army of the Republic Museum Virtual Tour Panoramas 
 Grand Army of the Republic Museum 
 National Register listings for Essex County
 Civil War Round Table GAR Hall page 
 Library of Congress list of GAR posts by state
 Archiplanet listing 

Clubhouses on the National Register of Historic Places in Massachusetts
Massachusetts
American Civil War museums in Massachusetts
Museums in Essex County, Massachusetts
Buildings and structures in Lynn, Massachusetts
National Register of Historic Places in Lynn, Massachusetts
1885 establishments in Massachusetts